The 2010 Meyers Norris Penny Charity Classic was held Oct. 15-18, 2010 in Medicine Hat, Alberta. It was held on week six of the 2010-11 World Curling Tour season. It featured both men's and women's events. The winning men's team received $C 10,000 while the winning women's team received $C 8,000.

Men's

Teams

Playoffs

Women's

Teams

Playoffs

External links
Official site

Meyers Norris Penny Charity Classic, 2010
Meyers Norris Penny Charity Classic
Meyers Norris Penny Charity Classic
Curling in Alberta
Sport in Medicine Hat